Naatele Sem Shilimela (born 30 July 1991 in Etayi, Omusati Region) is a Namibian wrestler. He competed in the -55 kg event at the 2012 Summer Olympics.

Major results

References

External links
 

1991 births
Living people
People from Omusati Region
Namibian male sport wrestlers
Olympic wrestlers of Namibia
Wrestlers at the 2012 Summer Olympics
African Wrestling Championships medalists
20th-century Namibian people
21st-century Namibian people